Margarethe Hormuth-Kallmorgen (22 August 1857–7 July 1916) was a German painter. She was known for her flower painting.

Biography
Hormuth was born on 22 August 1857 in Heidelberg. She studied painting with Ferdinand Keller. 

in 1882 she married the landscape painter Friedrich Kallmorgen with whom she had two children. The couple belonged to the Grötzinger Art Colony.

Hormuth-Kallmorgen  exhibited her work at the Palace of Fine Arts and The Woman's Building at the 1893 World's Columbian Exposition in Chicago, Illinois.

In 1898 she became a board member of the Karlsruher Malerinnen-Vereins. In the early 1900s she taught flower painting In 1902 her husband accepted a position at the Berlin University of the Arts and they moved to Berlin. Hormuth-Kallmorgen painted infrequently after the move.

Hormuth-Kallmorgen died on 7 July 1916 in Heidelberg

Legacy
In 1975 Grötzingen designated the Margarethe Hormuth Street in the Karlsruhe's district.

References

External links

1857 births
1916 deaths
19th-century German artists
German women artists
Artists from Heidelberg